Harrison Township is a township in Chautauqua County, Kansas, USA.  As of the 2000 census, its population was 114.

Geography
According to the USGS, it contains two cemeteries: Osro Falls and Rose Dale.

The streams of Cedar Creek, Dry Creek, Possum Trot Creek, Rock Creek and Spring Branch run through this township.

References
 USGS Geographic Names Information System (GNIS)

External links
 US-Counties.com
 City-Data.com

Townships in Chautauqua County, Kansas
Townships in Kansas